Crimen Ferpecto, released as The Perfect Crime in the United States, and as The Ferpect Crime in the United Kingdom, is a 2004 Spanish-Italian black comedy film co-written, produced and directed by Álex de la Iglesia. It stars Guillermo Toledo and Mónica Cervera.

Plot
Rafael is a women's clothing clerk at a large Madrid department store, Yeyo's.  His department is filled with beautiful, comely young women whom Rafael routinely seduces.  When Rafael vies for a management position with Don Antonio, a men's clothing clerk whom Rafael despises, a fluke causes Don Antonio to win the promotion.  He fires Rafael and a fight ensues in which Rafael accidentally kills Don Antonio.  Lourdes, an ugly and unassuming clerk at the store, witnesses the outcome of the fight, helps Rafael incinerate the body, and provides an alibi for the police.  Rafael wins his coveted promotion, but at a terrible cost: Lourdes blackmails Rafael into an unwanted relationship. He is forced to fire his many former lovers, to marry Lourdes (she proposes on a live reality TV show) and to support clown-like women's clothing of her design. Rafael becomes so depressed he begins to hallucinate, seeing the ghost of Don Antonio who suggests Rafael should kill Lourdes. As the police are also pressing him again, he causes a fire in the department store and fakes his death, in front of his wife and a police officer. Five years later, he (with a false identity) has a small business selling ties and socks, but Lourdes' clown-like clothes are a success and she becomes a millionaire, the film ending with Rafael gobsmacked at a clown fashion parade and Lourdes catwalk, panning out to a huge digital billboard reading "Our Love Is Forever".

Cast

Production 
A Spain-Italy international co-production, the film was produced by Pánico Films and Sogecine alongside Planet Pictures, with the participation of TVE, Canal+ and EiTB.

Release 
Distributed by Warner Sogefilms, the film was theatrically released in Spain on 22 October 2004.

The film had a limited US release in theatres of New York and Los Angeles in August 2005.

Reception
The film received very positive reviews from critics, 85% of critics gave the film a positive review based on 53 reviews and an average score of 7.1/10 according to Rotten Tomatoes.

Accolades 

|-
| rowspan = "6" align = "center" | 2005 || rowspan = "6" | 19th Goya Awards || Best Actor || Guillermo Toledo ||  || rowspan = "6" | 
|-
| Best Supporting Actor || Luis Varela || 
|-
| Best New Actress || Mónica Cervera || 
|-
| Production Supervision || Juanma Pagazaurtundua || 
|-
| Best Sound || Charla Schmukler, Jaime Fernández, Sergio Burmann || 
|-
| Best Special Effects || Félix Bergés, Juan Ramón Molina || 
|}

See also 
 List of Spanish films of 2004
 List of Italian films of 2004

References
Citations

Bibliography

External links 
 
 

2000s thriller films
2004 films
Spanish black comedy films
2000s crime comedy-drama films
Spanish crime comedy-drama films
Films directed by Álex de la Iglesia
Films shot in Madrid
Films scored by Roque Baños
Films with screenplays by Jorge Guerricaechevarría
2004 comedy films
2004 black comedy films
Sogecine films
2000s Spanish films
2000s Italian films